Åsane Seahawks is the name of an American football and cheerleading team located in Åsane, Norway that competes in the Norwegian Federation of American Sports.  The team borrowed its name and logo from the Seattle Seahawks of the National Football League. The club was founded in March, 1998.

The Seahawks football team is currently the best Norwegian team in division one football. Being undefeated for the past two seasons, as well as winning the division one title.
Led by coach Detjen and Reeve, the seahawks have built a stout defence and an impressive offence, led by players like Hasse "naked" Hellan, Endre "Andre the giant" Rasmussen, Bård "Tackle machine" Langva, Mauricio "Salsa" Salazar, "Tattoo" Tor, Edwin "The light" Chidi, Ragnar "The second best Tundal brother" Tundal, Torgeir "The other Tundal aka. Tuddi" Tundal, Kristoffer "Floffy" Botten, Pepe "rejected, aka sleeping beauty, aka tequila" Martinez, Terje "Tony" (Insert last name here), Håkon, Gustav "The short" Tisthamar, Tarje "Naked" Garmann, "Bearded" Ola, Alex "TheRapist" Hansen, Inge "babyface" Sundfjord, Sam "pancakes" something, and "Chocolate milk" Truls.

The Seahawks are known for their power run offence and 46 Bear style defence. Coach Mark Reeve preaches the philosophy that one or two plays can be more valuable to a team than a big and complicated playbook. The two plays they ran during their 2015 campaign were a HB power and a FB dive. These two plays won them every game of the regular season, except against Olavs menn, they won that game, but were stripped the win since the federation found out about an illegal formation used twice in the game. 
In the season final against the Haugesund Hurricanes the Seahawks opened up their playbook and added a naked bootleg for their quarterback. This turned out to be the only play they needed to run to win this game.
With the arrival of head coach Simon, in 2016. The seahawks have added two new plays to their playbook, a qb screen and the swinging gate. These new plays are unorthodox to say the least, and do bring a different dynamic to this power run offence. This makes this team really hard to prepare for, and they look like they are going to maintain their title in division one football in Norway.
The seahawks defence is led by Christian Detjen and is known as the 46 Norwegian blitz, this defence prides itself in stopping the run and getting to the quarterback. As a matter of fact this defence rarely gives up yards at all to opposing teams, the only exception being when they get flagged.
 
The Seahawks cheerleaders are one of the most-winning cheerleading squads in Norway the last years. One of their most recent merits is the bronze medal from the European Cheerleading Championship in Slovenia 2008.

External links
Åsane Seahawks Official Website

American football teams in Norway
Sport in Bergen